Kobina Bucknor (born 1925) was an animal scientist and painter.

Early life and education 
He was born in 1925 in Gold Coast now Ghana. He attended St. Augustine's College, Cape Coast at his secondary level and University College of the Gold Coast now University of Ghana where he acquired a Bachelor of Science degree in Zoology. In 1965 he obtained a doctorate degree from the Cornell University.

Career 
After his study, he joined the staff of the Ghana Academy of Sciences. He later left for Cornell University after which he came back to work with the Animal Research Institute and there he held the position of a director.

He held his first exhibition in Accra in the year 1966. He worked as a PhD trained research scientist in biology. He also served on the board directors of the Art council as the Chairman.

Works 
Bucknor used a style called sculptural idiom in his paintings which depicts life and culture in Ghana. This style he claimed was inspired by the silent wooden sculptures of Africa.<ref name=":1">{{Cite journal|title=J. C. Okyeres Bequest of Concrete Statuary in the KNUST Collection: Special Emphasis on Lonely Woman|url=https://www.longdom.org/articles/j-c-okyeres-bequest-of-concrete-statuary-in-the-knust1-collection-special-emphasis-on-lonely-woman.pdf|journal=Global Journal of Interdisciplinary Social Sciences|volume=4|pages=17}}</ref> To express his style, Bucknor said he captures the abstractions of the sculptural form, isolate the essence of the sculptural inspiration, digest what the inspiration presents and transform it into individual creative expression. 

he Some of his works include:Apofo Edodwir (The Arrival of the Fishing Fleet, Elmina Bay)Kadodo- Atsia (The spirit of the Agodzo Dances)At the Fish and Vegetable Market''
Calabash Musiga

Personal life 
He fathered Charles Kofi Bucknor.

References

Ghanaian painters
Ghanaian biologists
1925 births
Year of death missing
University of Ghana alumni
Cornell University alumni